Paul Dennis Aasness (December 16, 1939 – November 21, 2017) was an American farmer, businessman, and politician.

Aasness lived on the family farm near Doran, Minnesota. In 1958, Aasness graduated from Breckenridge High School in Breckenridge, Minnesota. He went to the North Dakota State College of Science. Aasness was a grain and livestock farmer in Wendell, Minnesota. He was also involved with the banking business. Aasness served on the North Ottawa Township Board and was a Republican. Aasness served in the Minnesota House of Representatives from 1979 to 1982. In 1995, Aasness and his wife moved to a farm in Orwell Township, Minnesota. Aasness died at Sanford Hospital in Fargo, North Dakota during surgery.

Notes

1939 births
2017 deaths
People from Grant County, Minnesota
People from Otter Tail County, Minnesota
People from Wilkin County, Minnesota
North Dakota State College of Science alumni
Businesspeople from Minnesota
Farmers from Minnesota
Minnesota city council members
Republican Party members of the Minnesota House of Representatives
20th-century American businesspeople